Sergey Babikov is a Tajikistani sport shooter, born in Dushanbe, who competes in the men's 10 metre air pistol. At the 2012 Summer Olympics, he finished 44th (last) in the qualifying round, failing to advance to the final round.

References

External links

Tajikistani male sport shooters
Year of birth missing (living people)
Living people
Sportspeople from Dushanbe
Olympic shooters of Tajikistan
Shooters at the 2004 Summer Olympics
Shooters at the 2008 Summer Olympics
Shooters at the 2012 Summer Olympics
Tajikistani people of Russian descent
Shooters at the 2002 Asian Games
Shooters at the 2006 Asian Games
Shooters at the 2010 Asian Games
Asian Games competitors for Tajikistan